Hermitage is a city in western Mercer County, Pennsylvania, United States. The population was 16,230 at the 2020 census. It is part of the Youngstown–Warren metropolitan area.

History
Formerly known as Hickory Township (hence Hickory High School with its Hickory Hornet mascot), the City of Hermitage, in Mercer County, Pennsylvania, was first settled in 1796, and the Township of Hickory was incorporated in 1832 from portions of the Shenango and Pymatuning townships. Following the incorporation of the cities of Sharon and Farrell and the boroughs of Sharpsville and Wheatland, the remainder of the Township was incorporated into a first class township.

The Home Rule Charter and Optional Plans Law, Act 62 of 1972, provided all local governments in Pennsylvania a unique opportunity of true "home rule" On August 9, 1972, Ordinance 13–72 was enacted by the Board of Commissioners, providing for a referendum on electing a Governmental Study Commission of nine members. On November 17, 1972, the electors voted in favor of a commission and selected nine members with the task of studying present Township government and the alternative of an Optional Plan of Government or a Home Rule Charter.

On March 13, 1974, the final report of the Government Study Commission recommended a Home Rule Charter, which was approved on May 21, 1974, by a vote of 1,375 to 546. The Charter was to become effective on January 1, 1976.

A resolution of April 9, 1975 stated the Board of Commissioners' intent to start an informal campaign to consider the possibility of a name change for the Township. A survey was conducted to determine possible names. In July, 1975, the Commissioners petitioned to the Court of Common Pleas of Mercer County pursuant to the Act of June 14, 1957, P.L. 330. The petition contained almost double the signature requirement of ten percent of the registered electors of the Township. The questions to be placed on the ballot were whether the name of the Township should be changed, and if so, which name: "Hermitage," "Mount Hickory," "Hickory Hills."

On November 4, 1975, the voters approved, by 2986 to 695, a change in name, and selected "Hermitage". The President Judge of Mercer County Court of Common Pleas issued an order on December 11, 1975, decreeing that the name of the Township of Hickory shall be changed to Hermitage, Pennsylvania, effective January 2, 1976.

On November 8, 1983, the voters approved, by 1971 to 1846, classification of the Township of Hermitage to the City of Hermitage. Hermitage became a third class city on January 1, 1984.

On May 31, 1985 Hermitage was struck by an F5 tornado that killed 18 people and injured 310. It was the strongest tornado ever recorded in Pennsylvania. On May 31, 2015, the 30th anniversary of the F5, an EF0 tornado touched down in the southern part of town. It flipped two cars, damaged the canopy at a Sheetz gas station and downed a few trees and branches.

Geography
Hermitage is located at  (41.232456, −80.460464).

Based on area, Hermitage is the third largest city in Pennsylvania.

The Shenango River Lake north of Hermitage is run by the US Army Corps of Engineers.

Demographics
As of the census of 2000, there were 16,157 people, 6,809 households, and 4,616 families residing in the city. The population density was 548.3 people per square mile (211.7/km2). There were 7,104 housing units at an average density of 241.1 per square mile (93.1/km2). The racial makeup of the city was 94.97% White, 3.09% African American, 0.04% Native American, 0.80% Asian, 0.01% Pacific Islander, 0.23% from other races, and 0.85% from two or more races. Hispanic or Latino of any race were 0.66% of the population.

There were 6,809 households, out of which 26.4% had children under the age of 18 living with them, 54.9% were married couples living together, 10.2% had a female householder with no husband present, and 32.2% were non-families. 29.4% of all households were made up of individuals, and 15.7% had someone living alone who was 65 years of age or older. The average household size was 2.32 and the average family size was 2.87.

In the city, the population was spread out, with 21.7% under the age of 18, 5.5% from 18 to 24, 24.6% from 25 to 44, 24.7% from 45 to 64, and 23.6% who were 65 years of age or older. The median age was 44 years. For every 100 females, there were 87.9 males. For every 100 females age 18 and over, there were 83.4 males.

The median income for a household in the city was $39,454, and the median income for a family was $46,994. Males had a median income of $41,506 versus $25,217 for females. The per capita income for the city was $23,227. About 6.3% of families and 8.2% of the population were below the poverty line, including 12.1% of those under age 18 and 6.5% of those age 65 or over.

Media

Television 
Because of Hermitage's location near the Pennsylvania/Ohio border, it is served by WKBN-TV (CBS), WFMJ-TV (NBC), WYTV (ABC), WYFX-LD (Fox) and WBCB (CW), all broadcast from nearby Youngstown, OH.

Radio 
Hermitage is served by AM radio stations such as WLOA (1470 AM) (Farrell, PA), WPIC (790 AM) (Sharon, PA), WKBN (570 AM) (Youngstown, OH) and FM radio stations such as WYFM/"Y-103" (102.9 FM), WLLF/"The River" (96.7 FM) (Mercer, PA), WYLE/"Willie 95.1" (95.1 FM) (Grove City, PA), WMXY/"Mix 98.9" (98.9 FM) (Youngstown, OH).

Tourism 
 Avenue of Flags – includes a War on Terror Memorial
 Buhl Farm Golf Course

Notable people 
Andre Coleman – former National Football League wide receiver and kick returner
Rod White – former US Olympic Team archer

International relations

Twin towns – sister cities 
See also: List of twin towns and sister cities in the United States

Hermitage is twinned with:

 Žipov, Slovakia

See also 
 Buhl Farm Golf Course

References

External links

City website
Hermitage, PA/city-data 
Buhl Farm Park 

 
Cities in Mercer County, Pennsylvania
Cities in Pennsylvania
Populated places established in 1796
1796 establishments in Pennsylvania